The 1941 Copa Aldao was the final match to decide the winner of the Copa Aldao, the 14th. edition of the international competition organised by the Argentine and Uruguayan Associations together. The final was contested by Uruguayan club Nacional and Argentine side River Plate.

Starting with this edition, a two-legged system was established. In the first match, played at San Lorenzo de Almagro Stadium, the local team beat Nacional with a conclusive 6–1 win. In the second leg played at Estadio Centenario in Montevideo, both teams drew 1–1, therefore River Plate won its third Copa Aldao in three editions contested.

Qualified teams

Venues

Match details

First leg

Second leg

References

1942 in Argentine football
1942 in Uruguayan football
Club Atlético River Plate matches
Club Nacional de Football matches
Football in Buenos Aires
Football in Montevideo